Amandeep Sidhu is an Indian television actress who is best known as Mahi Arora in Teri Meri Ikk Jindri and now notably as Mannat Kaur Dhillon in Choti Sarrdaarni.

Career
Sidhu started her career as a model and then entered the television industry with the parallel lead role of Purva Sinha in Yeh Pyaar Nahi Toh Kya Hai. In the same year, she got the negative lead role of Kanchan Khanna in Tantra.

In 2021, she made a breakthrough in her career with her first positive lead role of Mahi Arora in Zee TV series Teri Meri Ikk Jindri opposite Adhvik Mahajan. In April 2022, she is playing the lead role of Mannat Kaur Dhillon in Colors TV series Choti Sarrdaarni opposite Gaurav Bajaj.

In August 2022, she joined Naagin 6, the sixth season of Colors TV's supernatural revenge franchise Naagin as Anmol Gujral

Filmography

Television

Music videos

See also
 List of Hindi television actresses
 List of Indian television actresses

References

External links 
 

Living people
1993 births
Indian television actresses
Actresses in Hindi television
Indian soap opera actresses
21st-century Indian actresses
People from Punjab, India
Actresses from Delhi